Thokur railway station is the last station under the jurisdiction of Konkan Railway towards Mangalore. It serves the village of Thokur, near Pejavara in the Mangalore district of Karnataka, India. It falls under the Karwar railway region of the Konkan Railway. It is south of Surathkal railway station.

It is located at 7 m above sea level and has one platform. As of 2016, a single broad-gauge railway line exists at this station.

References

External links 

Railway stations in Dakshina Kannada district
Railway stations along Konkan Railway line
Karwar railway division